Aks is a 2012 Pakistani drama serial which aired on ARY Digital every Wednesday since 29 August 2012. Serial is directed by Nadeem Siddiqui and written by Sarwat Nazir, starring Zhalay Sarhadi, Mohib Mirza, Saba Hameed, Aiza Khan and Naila Jaffri. Serial was last aired on 5 February 2013. It was also aired in India on Zee Zindagi under the title Katha... Do Behnon Ki.

Overview 
The betrayal of one will give birth to the greed of another. AKS is the story of two sisters, who in their youth were torn apart both in relations and emotions, because of a lack of trust and false accusations. A conflict that later on is transferred to their children, forcing an already troubled family into further despair.

Plot 
Zakia lives with her three daughters and husband. Her two elder daughters Zohra and Zooni are from her previous marriage. It is revealed that her previous husband kicked her out of the house when she gave birth to a third daughter and refused to believe that was his daughter. That baby dies as it was very cold on the streets and Zakia's first husband refuses to have any mercy on her. Zakia's older sister (Shahbano) is married to her first husband's elder brother so is Zakia's 'jaithani' as well. She too supports Zakia's husband as she doesn't want to leave the luxurious life. Zakia has no support so is kicked out of the house. Zakia then remarries a poorer man.

In the future Zakia's daughters have  grown up and Zohra alliance has been fixed with her step-taya's son. Then Shahbano re-enters their lives and is now an even richer affluent woman and asks for Zohra's hand for her son Shah-Nawaz. However Zooni likes Shah-Nawaz as he is rich so can fulfill her desires of having a big house, with cars, servants and status. Zohra marries Shah-Nawaz and Zooni tries to ruin her sister's marriage. Thus the two sisters' (Shahbano and Zakia) destiny re-collides and history is replayed (hence the title Aks) as wealth again causes the relationship of two sisters (Zoni and Zohra) to break.

Cast 
 Zhalay Sarhadi Zohra Jawed
 Mohib Mirza as Shahnawaz
 Saba Hameed as Shahbano (Zahida)
 Aiza Khan as Zoonehrah Javed (Zooni)
 Naila Jaffri as Zakia Ismael
 Sukaina Khan as Saima
 Naeema Garaj as Naila
 Rubina Arif as Atiqa
 Faizan Khawaja

References 

2012 Pakistani television series debuts
ARY Digital original programming
Pakistani drama television series
Urdu-language television shows
2013 Pakistani television series endings
A&B Entertainment
Pakistani television series endings